Brenthurst may refer to:
Brenthurst primary school),it's a school that it's known the best school. (liñdokuhle molalathoko-)
 Brenthurst Estate, the Johannesburg residence of the Oppenheimer family;
 Brenthurst Gardens, the partially public gardens of the estate;
 Brenthurst Library, the estate library;
 The Brenthurst Initiative, a proposal regarding black economic empowerment;
 The Brenthurst Foundation, established to promote the concepts of the initiative.
 Brenthurst Wealth Management, a South African financial services provider.